Pharenda is a constituency of the Uttar Pradesh Legislative Assembly covering the city of Pharenda in the Maharajganj district of Uttar Pradesh, India.

Pharenda is one of five assembly constituencies in the Maharajganj Lok Sabha constituency. Since 2008, this assembly constituency is numbered 315 amongst 403 constituencies.

Members of Legislative Assembly

Election results

2022

2017
Bharatiya Janta Party candidate Bajrang Bahadur Singh won in last Assembly election of 2017 Uttar Pradesh Legislative Elections defeating Indian National Congress candidate Virendra Chaudhary by a margin of 2,354 votes.

References

External links
 

Assembly constituencies of Uttar Pradesh
Maharajganj district